The Kolkata–Guwahati Garib Rath Express is a bi-weekly Superfast Garib Rath Express, that runs between Guwahati (GHY) to Kolkata (KOAA, Chitpur), operated by NF Railway zone of Indian Railways. It falls into the category of Garib Rath-type trains meaning poor man's chariot. The rakes of this train belong to NF Railway and this is the only Garib Rath of the zone. The train travels through the states of Assam, West Bengal and Bihar.

Details
Numbered as 12517/12518. 12517 departs from Kolkata (KOAA) terminus on every Thursday and Sunday at 21:40 hours and arrives Guwahati every Friday and Monday at 15:55 hours. The train stops at Bandel Jn, Katwa, Azimganj, Malda Town, Kishanganj, New Jalpaiguri, New Alipurduar, Kokrajhar, New Bongaigaon, Goalpara Town en route Guwahati.

12518 departs Guwahati on every Wednesday and Saturday at 21:00 hours and arrives at Kolkata Terminus at 15:00 hours on every Thursday and Sunday covering a distance of 1,003 km in 18 hours with an average moving speed of 56 km/h. It stops at Goalpara Town, New Bongaigaon, Kokrajhar, New Alipurduar, New Jalpaiguri, Kishanganj, Malda Town, Azimgunj, Katwa, Bandel Jn en route Kolkata.

The train consists of 10 Garib Rath three-tier AC coaches and two generator cars. Total number of coaches is 12.

The train is hauled by diesel loco for the entire journey. Usual links are WDM-3D from Howrah shed or WDM-3A/WDP-4D/ WDP-4B/ WDP-4 from Siliguri Shed. The train has received a good patronage and is considered as an important train for the route. But now WDP-4D from HWH is onlink/Regular link of this train.

Major halts
The important intermediate stations where the train stops are as follows-

ASSAM
 (starts)
Goalpara Town (2 minutes)
 (2 minutes)
 (2 minutes)

BIHAR
 (2 minutes)

WEST BENGAL
 (2 minutes)
 (2 minutes)
New Jalpaiguri (Siliguri) (10 minutes)
 (10 minutes)
 (5 minutes)
 (2 minutes)
 (2 minutes)
 (2 minutes)
 (ends)

Traction 
This train is hauled by Diesel Loco Shed, Siliguri-based WDP-4/ WDP-4D/WDP-4D locomotive.

Other trains on the Kolkata–New Jalpaiguri sector
 22301/02 Howrah–New Jalpaiguri Vande Bharat Express
 12041/42 New Jalpaiguri–Howrah Shatabdi Express
 22309/10 Howrah–New Jalpaiguri AC Express
 12377/78 Padatik Express
 12343/44 Darjeeling Mail
 15959/60 Kamrup Express (via Guwahati)
 15961/62 Kamrup Express (via Bogibeel)
 13173/74 Sealdah–Agartala Kanchanjunga Express
 13175/76 Sealdah–Silchar Kanchanjunga Express
 12345/46 Saraighat Express
 15721/22 New Jalpaiguri-Digha Express
 12525/26 Dibrugarh–Kolkata Superfast Express
 13141/42 Teesta Torsha Express
 13147/48 Uttar Banga Express
 13181/82 Kolkata–Silghat Town Kaziranga Express
 22511/12 Lokmanya Tilak Terminus–Kamakhya Karmabhoomi Express
 15643/44 Puri–Kamakhya Weekly Express (via Howrah)
 12363/64 Kolkata–Haldibari Intercity Express

References

Garib Rath Express trains
Rail transport in Assam
Transport in Guwahati
Rail transport in West Bengal
Transport in Kolkata